William Thomas Fraser (born 12 August 1945) is a Scottish former professional footballer who played as an outside left for Huddersfield Town in the English Football League and for Heart of Midlothian in the Scottish Football League. He then moved to the United States, where he played in the North American Soccer League for the Boston Beacons, the Washington Darts and the Miami Gatos. Fraser was selected to the 1970 NASL All-star First team, and as an All-star Honorable mention in 1971 and 1972.

References

1945 births
Living people
Footballers from Edinburgh
Scottish footballers
Association football wingers
Huddersfield Town A.F.C. players
Heart of Midlothian F.C. players
Boston Beacons players
Washington Darts players
Miami Toros players
English Football League players
Scottish Football League players
North American Soccer League (1968–1984) players
Scottish expatriate sportspeople in the United States
Expatriate soccer players in the United States
Scottish expatriate footballers